The 1937 Ottawa Rough Riders finished in 2nd place in the Interprovincial Rugby Football Union with a 3–3 record, but lost in the IRFU Finals to the Toronto Argonauts in a total point series 26–21.

Regular season

Standings

Schedule

Postseason

References

Ottawa Rough Riders seasons